is a marine transportation company based in Japan.

Shin Nihonkai Ferry collaborated with Mitsubishi Shipbuilding in demonstrating the first successful sea voyage using an unmanned, fully autonomous navigation system on January 17, 2022, ferrying 240 kilometres, from Shinmoji in Northern Kyushu, to the Iyonada Sea, over seven hours, with a maximum speed of 26 knots.

Ships and Routes

Highspeed Ferries

Conventional Ferries

Terminals
Shin Nihonkai Ferry operates from six terminals.
Maizuru ferry terminal
Located in Maizuru, Kyoto

Tsuruga ferry terminal
Located in Tsuruga, Fukui

Niigata ferry terminal
Located in Niigata, Niigata

Akita ferry terminal
Located in Akita, Akita

Tomakomai ferry terminal
Located in Atsuma, Hokkaido

Otaru ferry terminal
Located in Otaru, Hokkaido

References

External links

  

Ferry companies of Japan
Companies based in Osaka Prefecture